Fourpeaked Mountain, also known as Fourpeaked Volcano, is an active stratovolcano located in the U.S. state of Alaska within Katmai National Park & Preserve. The volcano is nearly completely covered by Fourpeaked Glacier.

History
Before the eruption began on September 17, 2006, Fourpeaked Mountain had been dormant for over 10,000 years.

September 17, 2006
Pilots and other civilians reported two distinct and very large steam plumes coming from Fourpeaked Mountain. They were seen as far away as Homer, Alaska located northeast of Fourpeaked across Cook Inlet. Scientists on subsequent flights by USGS/AVO discovered that volcanic gases were being vented "vigorously" near the summit. Air sampling confirmed these findings. The Alaska Volcano Observatory officially classified this event as an explosive eruption.

September 20, 2006
The Alaska Volcano Observatory upgraded Fourpeaked Mountain from the classification "not assigned" to Level of Concern Color Code Yellow on September 20, 2006. This color-coded system was later renamed the Aviation Alert Level, but with the same color-coding system. At that time they began installing seismic monitoring equipment on the mountain and using fixed-wing aircraft as well as helicopters to monitor the volcano.

September 25, 2006 AVO eruption warning
On September 25, 2006, the AVO  warned that Fourpeaked would likely erupt again, and released the following information as part of a special information release:

October 3, 2006
The Alaska Volcano Observatory completed installation of another seismometer near Fourpeaked. Almost immediately they detected an earthquake swarm of lower magnitude quakes. This behavior continued intermittently through the spring of 2007. Fourpeaked also continued to vent volcanic gases at the same rate as revealed in earlier air sampling.

February 2007
In February, 2007 Fourpeaked began showing a relatively small but noticeable increase in activity. The Alaska Volcano Observatory reported February 8–9 that: "Three small explosive events were recorded by seismic and acoustic instruments Thursday and Friday (February 08–09) beginning at 10:36 AM AKST (1936 UTC) February 08. A possible large steam plume was observed in several partly cloudy satellite views Thursday afternoon." On February 18, the AVO reported a swarm of 13 small earthquakes under Fourpeaked, with the largest measuring 1.8 on the Richter magnitude scale. On February 23, the AVO conducted a gas flight and detected the continued emission of sulfur dioxide (SO2).

March 2007
The Alaska Volcano Observatory began reporting in its Daily Update on Fourpeaked Mountain that "several small explosion signals" were detected overnight, apparently continuing the series of small explosions which began on February 8. These "small explosions" continued until June, when Fourpeaked's classification was lowered to Green.

See also
List of volcanoes in the United States

References

External links
 United States Geological Survey
 UAF Geophysical Institute
 Alaska Division of Geological and Geophysical Surveys
 National Public Radio report

21st-century volcanic events
2006 in Alaska
Volcanoes of Alaska
Mountains of Alaska
Stratovolcanoes of the United States
Active volcanoes
Volcanoes of Kenai Peninsula Borough, Alaska
Mountains of Kenai Peninsula Borough, Alaska
Katmai National Park and Preserve
Aleutian Range
Pleistocene stratovolcanoes
Holocene stratovolcanoes